Dagoba may refer to:

Dagoba (band), a French metal band
Dagoba Chocolate, a brand of organic chocolate
Dağoba, Bayramiç, a village in Turkey

See also
Stupa (Sinhalese: "Dagoba"), a Buddhist reliquary
 Dagobah, a fictional planet in the Star Wars universe